Benjamin Berthet (18 September 1910 — 20 January 1981) was a French tennis player and coach.

Berthet was born to Polish-Jewish emigrants in New York and moved to France as a nine-year old.

In 1931 he made the singles quarter-finals of the French Championships, losing to the top seed Jean Borotra.

Berthet's title wins included the Polish International Championships.

A jeweller by profession, Berthet fought with the French Army in World War II and became a prisoner of war in 1941. During his captivity at Oflag IV-D he and other prisoners build tennis courts to play on.

Berthet continued to compete after the war until his appointment as non playing captain of the France Davis Cup team in 1954. He held this role for a then record 11-years, before being replaced by Gérard Pilet after the 1955 campaign.

References

External links
 

1910 births
1981 deaths
French male tennis players
Tennis people from New York (state)
American emigrants to France
French people of Polish-Jewish descent
French Army personnel of World War II
French prisoners of war in World War II
Jewish tennis players